Pura Purani (Aymara pura pura Xenophyllum (or a species of it), -ni a suffix to indicate ownership, "the one with the pura pura plant") is an about  mountain  in the Cordillera Real in the Andes of Bolivia. It is located in the La Paz Department, Los Andes Province, Batallas Municipality. It is between Phaq'u Kiwuta in the northeast and Mich'ini in the southwest.

References 

Mountains of La Paz Department (Bolivia)
Lakes of La Paz Department (Bolivia)